Myrcia lineata is a species of plant in the family Myrtaceae.

The plant is endemic to the Atlantic Forest ecoregion in southeastern Brazil.

References

lineata
Endemic flora of Brazil
Flora of the Atlantic Forest
Vulnerable flora of South America
Taxonomy articles created by Polbot